Michel Lefrançois de Lalande (21 April 1766 – 8 April 1839) was a French astronomer.

Biography 
He was the son of Jean Lefrançois, first cousin of Joseph Jérôme Lefrançois de Lalande, astronomer. He took the name of his cousin Brother Jerome, by order of the Court of the Seine on 13 June 1837 and became Le François de Lalande him and his descendants.

Jérôme de Lalande took Michel to Paris after the holidays of 1780 and immediately initiated him into his favorite study, that is, telescopic observation techniques, despite having the satisfaction of seeing him take an interest in them. Two years later, Michel's observation of a total lunar eclipse earned him the honor of seeing it published in the magazine journal des savants . .

On September 27, 1788, he married Marie-Jeanne Harlay, born in Paris in 1767, daughter of Jean François Harlay born in 1730 and Anne Cany born in 1744. She was also an astronomer and calculator, and on January 11, 1789, she gave birth to her first child : Isaac, so named in honor of Isaac Newton. On January 20, 1790, his first daughter was born. That same day, the comet discovered by Caroline Herschel is visible for the first time in Paris, so it will be called Caroline. He will die in childhood. his second daughter was born on July 7, 1793 and named Charlotte Uranie having as godfather Jean-Baptiste Delambre, astronomer and as godmother Charlotte of Saxe-Meiningen, Duchess of Gotha. His fourth and last child was born on March 26, 1802 and baptized Charles Auguste Frédéric Jérôme.

In 1789, at the age of 23, Michel Lefrançois de Lalande took over the direction of the observatory of the Military School and began a long series of observations. In three months, it recorded 2,500 stars and the following year more than 8,000. L'histoire céleste française, published by Jerome de Lalande, completed ten years later, has more than 50,000 stars, almost all calculated by Michel, assisted by Marie Jeanne, his wife, named Amelie by the Duchess of Gotha. He continued with the observations of the stars. In one year, he managed to register 12,000. Michel will observe and calculate all his life.

In 1792 he accompanied Jean-Baptiste Delambre, who was appointed to calculate the meridian arc of Dunkirk-Barcelona and thus the length of the meter . Then the Paris meridian and both begin to be measured around Paris..

Between May 8 and 9, 1795 (at the age of 29), he detected a faint star which he took to be a simple star. Between the two observations, thanks to the large quarter-circle telescope of the Military School, he noticed a gap and attributed it to his mistake. But he did not make a 3ª observation that would have allowed him to confirm the star's displacement from the first two observations and realize that it was an unknown planet, the planet Neptune, which was discovered 50 years later by Le Verrier. .

In 1795 he was elected a member of the Bureau des longitudes and, six years later, became a first-class resident member of the astronomy section of the Académie des sciences . He was also promoted to officer of the Legion of Honor . His grave is in the Père Lachaise, east cemetery.

See also 

 Isaac Newton
 Telescopes

References

External links 

1766 births
1839 deaths
18th-century French astronomers
Members of the French Academy of Sciences
People from Normandy
Burials at Père Lachaise Cemetery
19th-century French astronomers